KCLF (1500 AM) is a radio station broadcasting an urban contemporary format which includes blues, gospel, news, oldies, and zydeco. Licensed to New Roads, Louisiana, United States. The station is currently owned by New World Broadcasting Company.

On January 12, 2015, KCLF was granted a Federal Communications Commission construction permit to move to a new transmitter site, decrease day power to 850 watts and add night operation with 18 watts.

History
The station was assigned the call letters KQXL on January 1, 1979.  On September 1, 1981, the station changed its call sign to the current KCLF.

References

External links
 

Radio stations in Louisiana
Urban contemporary radio stations in the United States
Daytime-only radio stations in Louisiana
Radio stations established in 1965
1965 establishments in Louisiana